Tomasz Wróbel (born July 10, 1982 in Tarnów) is Polish football manager and former player, currently in charge of Polish club Rozwój Katowice.

Career
He is a trainee of Rozwój Katowice. Before moving to GKS Bełchatów he played for Górnik Polkowice.

References

External links
 
 

1982 births
Living people
Polish footballers
GKS Bełchatów players
GKS Katowice players
Rozwój Katowice players
Ekstraklasa players
Sportspeople from Tarnów
Association football midfielders
Polish football managers